1959 Országos  Bajnokság I (men's water polo) was the 53rd water polo championship in Hungary. There were ten teams who played two-round match for the title.

Final list 

* M: Matches W: Win D: Drawn L: Lost G+: Goals earned G-: Goals got P: Point

2. Class 
1. Szentes 26, 2. MTK 25, 3. Csepel Autó 23, 4. Tatabánya 20, 5. Budai Spartacus 16, 6. Bp. VTSK 11, 7. Bp. Építők 9, 8. Hódmezővásárhelyi MTE 8, 9. Szolnoki Honvéd 6 point. SZEAC were deleted.

Sources 
Gyarmati Dezső: Aranykor (Hérodotosz Könyvkiadó és Értékesítő Bt., Budapest, 2002.)

1959 in water polo
1959 in Hungarian sport
Seasons in Hungarian water polo competitions